
Gmina Porąbka is a rural gmina (administrative district) in Bielsko County, Silesian Voivodeship, in southern Poland.

The gmina covers an area of ,and as of 2019 its total population is 15,582.

Villages
Gmina Porąbka contains the villages and settlements of Bujaków, Czaniec, Kobiernice and Porąbka.

Neighbouring gminas
Gmina Porąbka is bordered by the gminas of Andrychów, Czernichów, Kęty, Kozy and Łękawica.

Twin towns – sister cities

Gmina Porąbka is twinned with:
 Túrkeve, Hungary

References

Porabka
Bielsko County